Morocco competed in the Summer Olympic Games for the first time at the 1960 Summer Olympics in Rome, Italy. 47 competitors, all men, took part in 45 events in 10 sports.

Medalists

Athletics

Morocco took 8 male athletes to the 1960 Olympic Games.

Key
Note–Ranks given for track events are within the athlete's heat only
Q = Qualified for the next round
q = Qualified for the next round as a fastest loser or, in field events, by position without achieving the qualifying target
N/A = Round not applicable for the event
Bye = Athlete not required to compete in round

Men

Boxing

Morocco took seven boxers to the 1960 Olympic Games, none of whom won a fight.

Cycling

Four cyclists represented Morocco in 1960.

Road

Time trial

Fencing

Seven fencers represented Morocco in 1960.

Individual Foil

Round One

Three fencers from Morocco participated in Round One which was a group stage.

Pool 8

  —  5-2
  —  5-0
  —  5-4
  —  5-2
  —  5-0

Pool 10

  —  5-2
  —  5-2
  —  5-2
  —  5-1
  —  5-0

Pool 12

  —  5-4
  —  5-1
  —  5-0
  —  5-2
  —  5-0

Team Foil

Round One

Morocco participated in Round One which was a group stage. The six fencers representing Morocco were Charles El-Gressy, Abderraouf El-Fassy, Abderrahman Sebti, Abbes Harchi, Mohamed Ben Joullon, Jacques Ben Gualid. Four fencers were selected for each match. Each fencer had four bouts per match.

Pool 8

  —  16-0
  —  16-0

Individual Épée

Round One

Three fencers from Morocco participated in Round One which was a group stage.

Pool 1

  —  5-3
  —  5-3
  —  5-3
  —  5-1
  —  5-0

Pool 3

  —  5-4
  —  5-3
  —  5-0
  —  5-1
  —  5-2
  —  5-3

Pool 6

  —  5-1
  —  5-2
  —  5-2
  —  5-4
  —  5-0

Team Épée

Round One

Morocco participated in Round One which was a group stage. The five fencers representing Morocco were Abderraouf El-Fassy, Abderrahman Sebti, Abbes Harchi, Mohamed Ben Joullon and Charles Bénitah. Four fencers were selected for each match. Each fencer had four bouts per match.

Pool 5

  —  15-1
  —  12-4

Individual Sabre

Round One

Three fencers from Morocco participated in Round One which was a group stage.

Pool 2

  —  5-1
  —  5-1
  —  5-1

Pool 3

  —  5-2
  —  5-2
  —  5-2
  —  5-2

Pool 9

  —  5-1
  —  5-3
  —  5-1
  —  5-0
  —  5-2

Team Sabre

Round One

Morocco participated in Round One which was a group stage. The four fencers representing Morocco were Abderraouf El-Fassy, Abderrahman Sebti, Mohamed Ben Joullon and Jacques Ben Gualid.

Pool 6

  —  16-0
  —  15-1

Gymnastics

Men's Individual

Six gymnasts from Morocco took part in the individual event.

Individual finals

Men's team

The same six gymnasts competed in the team event. Each gymnast to perform a compulsory and an optional exercise on all six apparatuses. Top five scores per team on each of the 12 exercises count towards the team score.

Modern pentathlon

Two male pentathletes represented Morocco in 1960, but neither completed the event.

Individual

Sailing

Only one Moroccan sailor competed in the Olympic Regatta in Naples. El-Moustafa Haddad competed in the Finn class.

Shooting

Four shooters represented Morocco in 1960.

Weightlifting

Wrestling

Scoring by negative points, with negative points given for any result short of a fall. Accumulation of 6 negative points eliminated the wrestler. Morocco had 5 wrestlers all competing in the Greco-Roman category.

Men's Greco-Roman Wrestling

References

External links
Official Olympic Reports
International Olympic Committee results database

Nations at the 1960 Summer Olympics
1960
1960 in Moroccan sport